Butler station may refer to:

Butler station (MBTA), a light rail station in Boston, Massachusetts, United States
Butler station (New Jersey), a former railway station now used as a museum in Morris County, New Jersey, United States
Butler railway station, in Perth, Western Australia, Australia
the work or waiting area for a domestic butler

See also
Butler (disambiguation)